Mount Hehuan (also called Joy Mountain) is a  mountain in Central Taiwan. The peak lies on the borders of Nantou and Hualien counties and is located within Taroko National Park. Hehuanshan is a popular destination in central Taiwan. The 3,421-metre east peak and 3,422-metre north peak of Hehuanshan are both higher than the main peak.

Mount Hehuan is part of the Central Mountain Range (中央山脈).

Recreation 
Snow, rare in the rest of Taiwan, is relatively common on Mount Hehuan during the winter months. Highway 14 leads to Wuling, a saddle between the main peak and the east peak of Hehuanshan. At 3,275-metre, Wuling is also the highest point of Taiwan accessible by highway. From Highway 14, a trail leads to the summit of the main peak. At the summit, there is a weather station.

History 

In the past, a military training area was built in the proximity of Hehuanshan. The mountain range also features the remains of a ski lift, reportedly used by Taiwan's elite during the martial law period and inaccessible to most people. The unreliability of snowfall has meant that the ski lift was abandoned years ago. Remains of the ski lift mechanism are still visible to hikers on the east peak trail.

Highway 14 

Highway 14 connects Puli, through  Wushe (Ren-ai), and Qingjing Farm to Wuling. The narrow and winding road is considered a dangerous and difficult road. The road is often clogged in winter, when many locals travel up the mountain to see snow. 

Highway 14 is currently the only available road crossing the Central Mountain Range via the famous Taroko Gorge.  The Central Cross-Island Highway, which crossed the mountains north of Hehuanshan, was damaged during the September 21, 1999 earthquake and closed indefinitely.

See also 
 List of mountains in Taiwan

Mountains of Taiwan
Landforms of Nantou County
Landforms of Hualien County
Dark-sky preserves